The Boeing Model 360 is an American experimental medium-lift tandem rotor cargo helicopter developed privately by Boeing to demonstrate advanced helicopter technology.  The aircraft was intended as a technology demonstrator, with no plans to put the type into production, and many of its design features were carried onto other programs including the RAH-66 Comanche and V-22 Osprey.  The sole prototype has been preserved and is a static exhibit at the American Helicopter Museum in West Chester, Pennsylvania.

Design and development

Boeing Vertol developed its Model 360 in the 1980s as a technology demonstrator with company funds.  It was a new design and made significant use of composites.

The Boeing Model 360 differed from its brethren CH-46 and CH-47 tandem rotor helicopters by incorporating extensive amounts of composite materials in structural and dynamic components, namely in advanced rotor heads composed of fiberglass and graphite composites, along with graphite fuselage frames and longerons.  The exterior of the craft integrated a Nomex core, surfaced by a Kevlar woven mesh with graphite-strengthened edges.  The two tandem four-bladed counter-rotating rotors were each driven by Avco Lycoming AL5512 turboshaft engines mounted on either side of the rear fuselage. In another departure from its military brethren, the Model 360 had no external sponsons containing the landing gear or fuel, the tricycle landing gear instead retracting into the main fuselage. Fuel was contained in three crashworthy cells below the cabin floor.

The Model 360 featured a glass cockpit with six multi-function displays (MFD).

Specifications

See also

References

External links
 Boeing 360 on Janes Aircraft
 Ground Shake Test of the Boeing Model 360 Helicopter Airframe, NASA, March 1989, Retrieved Dec 12, 2008
 N360BV Prototype on Airliners.net

360
1980s United States experimental aircraft
Tandem rotor helicopters
1980s United States helicopters
Aircraft first flown in 1987